Minuscule 224 (in the Gregory-Aland numbering), ε 1212  (Soden), is a Greek minuscule manuscript of the New Testament, on parchment. Paleographically it has been assigned to the 12th century. It has marginalia.

Description 

The codex contains only the text of the Gospel of Matthew, on 97 parchment leaves (size ). The text is written in one column per page, 19 lines per page.

There is also a division according to the Ammonian Sections, but without references to the Eusebian Canons.

Text 

The Greek text of the codex is a representative of the Byzantine text-type. Aland placed it in Category V.

History 

According to Gregory the manuscript was written in Calabria. In 1716 it was in Naples and belonged to Eusebius Caraccioli. It was examined by Treschow and Alter. Alter used it in his edition of the Greek text of the New Testament. C. R. Gregory saw it in 1887.

Formerly it was held at the Imperial Library at Vienna (Suppl. Gr. 97). It is currently housed at the Biblioteca Nazionale (Cod. Neapol. ex Vind. 10), at Naples.

See also 

 List of New Testament minuscules
 Biblical manuscript
 Textual criticism

References

Further reading 

 

Greek New Testament minuscules
12th-century biblical manuscripts